Jingo was an unincorporated community located in Roane County, West Virginia, United States. The Jingo Post Office no longer exists.

References 

Unincorporated communities in West Virginia
Unincorporated communities in Roane County, West Virginia